Pitcairnia chiapensis is a plant species in the genus Pitcairnia. This species is endemic to Mexico.

Cultivars
 Pitcairnia 'Chiamenez'
 Pitcairnia 'Mexican Blondes'

References

BSI Cultivar Registry Retrieved 11 October 2009

chiapensis
Endemic flora of Mexico